Marie is a 2020 short documentary directed by Sam Abbas about labor during homebirths. The film was originally scheduled for an April 2020 theatrical window for Academy consideration; however it premiered exclusively on IGTV August 10, 2020 due to the COVID cancellation of all theaters in New York City. Based on the 93rd Academy Awards' new rules to offset the COVID interruptions Marie is eligible and running for a nomination.

Plot
An observation of labor during a home-birth.

Subjects
 Marie Brewer (Mother)
 Daniel Bauer (Father)
 Takiya S. Ballard (Midwife)

Filming
Abbas stated during a Columbia Global Centers panel that part of what he was going to be working on is a short documentary focusing only on labor during a homebirth making it very different from Alia's Birth where he shows the delivery of a baby during a home-birth. Both projects where shot at the same time and with the same crew.

Reception
Film Threat well reviewed saying "the grand tale of bringing life into the world and shows off what women go through without the aid of drugs, gurneys, and cold metallic stirrups." Claiming that Marie is a very real experience when it comes to the moments before life begins.

The London Based, UK Film Review, in their positive review wrote, "Ultimately what Abbas wants to do is make us vicariously feel, if only an infinitesimal amount, some of what Marie feels. Abbas really tries to get across the ebbs and flows of the labour process, the uncensored discomfort, endurance and stamina involved with any birth, let alone one stretched out over two-and-a-half days, something very rarely depicted so vehemently in cinema."

References

External links

 Profile on Mubi (streaming service)
MARIE onIGTV
Marie (2020) by Sam Abbas onVimeo

2020 films
2020 short documentary films
American short documentary films
2020s English-language films
2020s American films